Bhargavaea ginsengi  is a Gram-positive, moderately halotolerant and non-motile bacterium from the genus of Bhargavaea which has been isolated from the roots of a ginseng plant in Beijing in China.

References

External links
Type strain of Bhargavaea ginsengi at BacDive -  the Bacterial Diversity Metadatabase	

Bacillales
Bacteria described in 2009